The Perfect Prescription is the second studio album by British neo-psychedelic band Spacemen 3, released in 1987. It is a concept album, "a vision of a drug trip from inception to its blasted conclusion, highs and lows fully intact."

Pitchfork Media listed it at #50 in their list of the greatest albums of the 80s.

Content

The music becomes progressively more orchestral and serene until the high of the trip, represented by "Ecstasy Symphony"/"Transparent Radiation (Flashback)," moving on to the moment of realisation where the high has faded and the comedown ensues, represented by the harsh opening guitar chords in "Things'll Never Be the Same." Coming down is represented in the blues-based "Come Down Easy," while the potentially fatal effects of an overdose are portrayed in the final track, "Call the Doctor." The music was written by the band, except "Transparent Radiation," which is a Red Krayola cover from the 1967 album The Parable of Arable Land. The band also borrows heavily from the gospel standard "In My Time of Dying" in "Come Down Easy," and it pays homage to Lou Reed in "Ode to Street Hassle."

Track listing

1989 re-issue (Fire Refire CD6)
Adds b-sides from the "Take Me to the Other Side" single as bonus tracks:

1995 re-issue (Genius Records CD)
Adds two tracks from the "Walkin' With Jesus" single and the Transparent Radiation EP as bonus tracks:

1996 re-issue (Taang! Records CD)

Personnel
 Sonic Boom - guitar, vocals, tremolo, organ
 Jason - guitar, vocals, organ, Farfisa organ
 Bassman - bass
 Rosco - drums, percussion

Additional Personnel
 Alex Green - saxophone
 Mick Manning - trumpet
 Owen John - violin

Liner notes
The vinyl edition of The Perfect Prescription includes liner notes by author R. Hunter Gibson:

"'The Perfect Prescription' is an album that will be left out of the rock 'n' roll readers, just as the great texts bid Bo Diddley throw down his cloak for the quickstep of Eddie Cochran.
If there has ever been an untrumpeted classic, here it is. An arcane, apocryphal document, this record, in late '80s UK, was telegraphing a message of unconcerned hope in a world hypnotised by guilt-ridden social work rock. Here, more than anywhere, Spacemen 3 have a vested interest in absolutely nothing.
It is revolutionary and militant where most angry young rock is liberal at best. It is extreme and accurate. Like 'Aftermath' it captures every aspect of the age that would later be analysed. As the unassuming soundtrack of a country breaking down and a world breaking up, its very nature means that it has been ignored.
Spacemen 3, like all the great rock 'n' rollers, from Arthur Parker to Paul Gauguin, are revolutionary; this is their great manifesto, striding free from the pharmacy raid of their debut armed with the keys of the musical medicine cabinet. When we left off things would never be the same. But the other side of the locked door, well, it's like the white one in the story.
If 'Sound of Confusion' denied the wider stretches of the sense in favour of the immediately, roughly sensual, this script panned out from some suburban global village Viet vet subculture into a poppyfield undersown with righteous paranoia. And still the smell of burning rubber on trash yankee wheels thickens the air ... 
What goes on? Get the answer if you want it."

Forged Prescriptions

Forged Prescriptions is a compilation album by Spacemen 3 released on Space Age Recordings in 2003. It contains alternate and demo versions of songs from The Perfect Prescription, and some previously unreleased tracks.

In his liner notes, Spacemen 3 member Sonic Boom says this release presents the album's songs in their "full guitar laden versions with all the layers of beautifully streamlined guitar—considered by us to be too hard to replicate live and therefore reduced for the original release."

References

Spacemen 3 albums
1987 albums
Glass Records albums
Fire Records (UK) albums
Taang! Records albums